Tanousia runtoniana is an extinct European species of freshwater snail with gills and an operculum, a gastropod mollusk in the family Lithoglyphidae.

References

Further reading 
 Esu D. & Gianolla D. (2008). "The occurrence of the genus Tanousia Servain (Mollusca, Gastropoda, Hydrobiidae) in the Middle Pleistocene Piànico-Sèllere Basin (Bergamo, Northern Italy)". Quaternary International 190(1): 4–9. 

Lithoglyphidae
Pleistocene gastropods
Gastropods described in 1880